Christina, Queen of Sweden was Queen regnant 1632.

Christina of Sweden may also refer to:

Queens
Christina Björnsdotter, Queen consort of Sweden around 1156
Christina Hvide, Queen consort of Sweden 1164
Christina Abrahamsdotter, Queen consort of Sweden 1470
Christina of Saxony, Queen consort of Sweden 1497
Christina of Holstein-Gottorp, Queen consort of Sweden 1604
Christina, Queen of Sweden 1632 to 1654. Christina (18 December 1626 – 19 April 1689), a member of the House of Vasa, was Queen of Sweden from 1632 until her abdication in 1654.

Princesses
Christina Ingesdotter of Sweden, Swedish princess, died 1122
Christina, Swedish princess about 1166, daughter of King Carl I
Christina, Swedish princess (alleged), died 1252, daughter of King Sweartgar II
Christina, Swedish princess de facto around 1242 as the daughter of Jarl Birger of Sweden and his royal Swedish wife
Christina, Swedish princess (consort) 1302, married to Prince Valdemar, Duke of Finland
Christina, Swedish princess de facto 1448 as the daughter of King Carl II
Christina of Denmark, Swedish princess 1520
Christina, Princess of Sweden 1598, daughter of King Carl IX (died in infancy)
Christina Augusta, Princess of Sweden 1623, daughter of King Gustav II Adolph (died in infancy)
Christina Magdalen, Princess of Sweden 1654 as the sister of King Carl X Gustav
Princess Christina, Mrs. Magnuson, née Princess of Sweden 1943

Footnotes

References